The 23. edizione Mille Miglia  was an auto race held on a 992.332 mile (1597 km) course made up entirely of public roads around Italy, mostly on the outer parts of the country on 28–29 April 1956. The route was based on a round trip between Brescia and Rome, with start/finish, in Brescia. It was the 3rd round of the 1956 World Sportscar Championship.

As in previous years, the event this not strictly a race against each other, this is race against the clock, as the cars are released at one-minute intervals with the larger professional class cars going before the slower cars, in the Mille Miglia, however  the smaller displacement slower cars started first. Each car number related to their allocated start time. For example Peter Collins's car had the number 551, he left Brescia at 5:51am, while the first cars had started late in the evening on the previous day. Some drivers went with navigators, others didn't; a number of local Italian drivers had knowledge of the routes being used and felt confident enough that they wouldn't need one.

This race was won by Scuderia Ferrari driver Eugenio Castellotti without the aid of a navigator. He completed the 992-mile distance in 11 hours, 37 minutes and 10 seconds- an average speed of 85.403 mph (137.442 km/h). The Italian finished 12 minutes in front of their second-placed team-mates, the English pairing of Collins and Louis Klemantaski. Luigi Musso and Juan Manuel Fangio were next ensuring Ferrari finished 1-2-3-4.

Report

Entry

A total of 426 cars were entered for the event, across 13 classes based on engine sizes, ranging from up to 750cc to over 2.0-litre, for Grand Touring Cars, Touring Cars and Sport Cars. Of these, 365 cars started the event.

Following Daimler Benz AG and Lancia both withdrawing from motor sport at the end of 1955, this left the World Sportscar Championship wide open for Ferrari to regain the title their held in 1953 and 1954. Although Maserati had other ideas. After one win apiece from the first two races, Ferrari had the upper hand, and led the championship by four points.

For this year's Mille Miglia, the only factory teams were Ferrari and Maserati. Scuderia Ferrari brought five cars: two 290 MMs for Castellotti and Fangio, two 860 Monzas for Collins and Musso, with a 250 GT SWB for Olivier Gendebien. The other works team was Maserati, who entered three cars driver by Stirling Moss (350S), Piero Taruffi and Cesare Perdisa, both in 300S. Meanwhile, there was a significant contingent of Mercedes-Benz cars – no less than 14 semi-works Mercedes-Benz 300SL. With the numbers of participants being reduced by the organisers, many international racing teams and their drivers stayed away from the race.

Race

Ferrari's race plan was, in the first half of the race, Castellotti and Fangio would push hard in their faster cars, with Collins and Musso, saving their strength for the return leg, arriving fresh in Rome, then able to attack over the rough and winding mountain passes of Radicofani, Futa and Raticosa. Despite this plan Maserati of Taruffi took the lead between Ravenna and Forlì, but problems with wet brakes forced him to stop at Savignano sul Rubicone. The Mercedes of Wolfgang von Trips took over the lead, ahead of Castellotti and the Mercedes of Fritz Reiss. The early race sensation were the two Osca drivers Giulio Cabianca and Umberto Maglioli that were laying in fifth and seventh in their little 1.2 litre 4-cylinder cars. But von Trips left the road in Pescara, while Moss did the same in Antrodoco. By Rome, Reiss would be the only threat to Ferrari, but he too was forced to slow down, eventually finishing tenth overall. Castellotti went on to win the event. In the fast mountain passes down to Pescara, the Osca drivers could keep up the pace and soon fell back the standings.

However, the event was marred by many severe accidents resulting in 6 deaths and 14 people injured, largely due to heavy rain throughout Italy in the early hours of the race. In spite of the attempt by the organisers to make the event safer, there were still a number of fatal accidents, including one that resulted in the death of the Englishman, John Heath. He came off the wet road before Ravenna and overturned into a ditch. He died the next day from his injuries in a local hospital. Another fatality occurred in the small town of Montemarciano on the Adriatic coast 260 miles (416 km) into the race, when the Mercedes-Benz 300 SL, driven by the German pairing of Helmut Busch and Wolfgang Piwco. At the time of the accident, Piwco was driving when the car hit a wall, killing him instantly, while Busch suffered only minor injuries, also one spectator injured. A third accident also claimed the life of Swiss driver Max Berney who was killed just outside Ravenna after his Alfa rolled after having hit a house in pouring rain at four o' clock in the morning. His co-driver Ivo Badaracco was seriously injured but survived. In addition to the 3 competitors 3 spectators were also killed. An Alfa Romeo 1900 driven by Aldo Giacobi went off the road barely 20 miles into the race- and 2 spectators, Egidio Pincella and Igino Leoncelli were both killed on impact. The car then crossed the road, hit a parked vehicle and injured other five other spectators. Later on in Pescara 400 miles (640 km) into the race a Stanguellini 750 Sport driven by Giorgio Cecchini hit and killed spectator Guerrino Sciarra.

When Castellotti arrived back in Brescia, he had more than a ten-minute advantage over Collins. With Musso in third, Fangio in fourth and Gendebien fifth completing a top five clean sweep for Ferrari. Maserati experienced a debacle with only Jean Behra making back to Brescia after making several repairs on his way to 20th overall. Behind the Ferrari, were three Mercedes of Paul von Metternich, Wolfgang Seidel and Jacques Pollet, in sixth, seventh and eighth respectively.  Cabianca would eventually finish in ninth after a spirited drive. Reiss was plagued by engine problems late in the race, arrived in tenth. Castellotti reached Brescia at 17:25; 11 hours and 37 minutes after he left Brescia at 05:48, arriving  with an average speed of 85.403 mph.

Classification

Official Results

Of the 365 starters, 182 were classified as finishers. Therefore, only a selection of notably racers has been listed below.

Class Winners are in Bold text.

Class Winners

Standings after the race

Note: Only the top five positions are included in this set of standings.
Championship points were awarded for the first six places in each race in the order of 8-6-4-3-2-1. Manufacturers were only awarded points for their highest finishing car with no points awarded for positions filled by additional cars. Only the best 3 results out of the 5 races could be retained by each manufacturer. Points earned but not counted towards the championship totals are listed within brackets in the above table.

References

Further reading

Anthony Pritchard. The Mille Miglia: The World's Greatest Road Race. J H Haynes & Co Ltd. 
Leonardo Acerbi. Mille Miglia Story 1927-1957. Giorgio Nada Editore. 

Mille Miglia
Mille Miglia